Jorge Marcos Andia Pizarro (born February 8, 1988 in Santa Cruz de la Sierra) is a Bolivian football midfielder who currently plays for first division team Universitario de Sucre.

Andia won the 2009 Clausura title with Blooming.

Club titles

References

External links
 
 
 

1988 births
Living people
Sportspeople from Santa Cruz de la Sierra
Bolivian footballers
Association football midfielders
Club Blooming players
Universitario de Sucre footballers